Willy Suarez Maceo (born November 16, 1996) is a Havana, Cuba-born former real estate agent charged the murders of two homeless men in Miami.

Maceo was charged with first-degree murder in the killings of a 56-year-old man on December 21, 2021, and a 59-year-old man in October 2021. He was also charged with attempted murder for another shooting in December 2021.

Maceo attended Miami Sunset Senior High School.

See also
 Lloyd Gomez, known as The Phantom Hobo Killer.
 Vaughn Greenwood, known as The Skid Row Slasher.
 Skid Row Stabber, a serial killer who murdered 11 homeless people in Los Angeles between 1978 and 1979.

References

Living people
1996 births
2020s in Florida
2021 in Florida
People from Havana
Cuban expatriates in the United States
Attacks in the United States in 2021
Violence against men in North America